Jan Sebastian Söderberg (born 19 September 1990) is a Swedish professional golfer.

Early life and amateur career
Söderberg was born in Eksjö in Småland, Sweden, but grew up playing golf at Delsjö Golf Club in Gothenburg on the west coast of the country. He won four junior tournaments in the Gothenburg area.

He was part of the Swedish team winning the 2008 European Boys' Team Championship at Bled Golf Club, Slovenia. He also represented Sweden twice at the European Amateur Team Championship.

Söderberg played college golf at Coastal Carolina University in Conway, South Carolina from 2009 to 2013, where he won twice.

His best World Amateur Golf Ranking was 51st.

Professional career
Söderberg turned professional in August 2013 and won twice on the Nordic Golf League the following month.

In 2014, he played all three stages of the European Tour qualifying school, finishing 39th. This earned him membership of the Challenge Tour for 2015.

Söderberg then played on the European Tour and Challenge Tour in 2015. In 2016, he won the inaugural event of the 2016 Challenge Tour season, the Barclays Kenya Open.

In June 2016, through sectional qualifying in England, he qualified for his first major championship entry, the U.S. Open at Oakmont Country Club in Pennsylvania, were he missed the cut by two strokes.

In a high quality field at the 2019 Omega European Masters in September at Crans-sur-Sierre Golf Club, Switzerland, on the European Tour, after shooting a 14-under 266 score over 72 holes, Söderberg found himself in a five-man playoff for the title. One of Söderberg's competitors were the newly crowned PGA Tour FedEx Cup Champion Rory McIlroy, who made five birdies in his last seven holes to catch the leaders. On the first extra hole, the par 4 18th, Söderberg claimed the biggest title of his career with a good approach and an eight feet birdie putt, when McIlroy and Kalle Samooja, missed their birdie-putts from shorter distances.

The win in Switzerland earned Söderberg a first prize of €416,000, an exemption through the end of the 2021 European Tour season and moved him to a career best 107th on the Official World Golf Ranking, advancing from 287th the week before. He finished the 2019 season 52nd on the Race to Dubai rankings.

In January 2020, Söderberg set a record for the European Tour by playing the quickest round in the final round of the Omega Dubai Desert Classic. Teeing off first with a local marker and his caddie, he decided to attempt it and shot a round of 75; a better score than 30 golfers who played at normal pace. Söderberg played in 96 minutes, beating the previous record of 119 minutes set by Thomas Pieters.

In 2021, Söderberg finished tied second in two tournaments in Spain back to back. He was joint runner-up with Min Woo Lee at the 2021 Estrella Damm N.A. Andalucía Masters, 3 strokes behind Matt Fitzpatrick. The following week he finished a stroke behind Jeff Winther at the Mallorca Golf Open. He ended the season 61st in the Race to Dubai.

Söderberg again came close to adding a second European Tour title at the 2022 British Masters at The Belfry. He entered the final round six strokes off the lead but emerged from the chasing pack to set the clubhouse target at nine under. However, Thorbjørn Olesen of Denmark produced a sensational eagle-birdie finish to deny him a second title, and he finished solo second.

Amateur wins
2008 Carin Koch Junior Open (Gullbringa G&CC, Sweden)
2009 Chalmers Junior Open (Chalmers GC, Sweden), Carl Pettersson Hovås Junior Open (Göteborg GC, Sweden)
2010 Carl Pettersson Hovås Junior Open (Göteborg GC, Sweden)
2012 Furman Intercollegiate
2013 Insperity ASU Invitational
Sources:

Professional wins (6)

European Tour wins (1)

European Tour playoff record (1–0)

Challenge Tour wins (2)

Nordic Golf League wins (3)

Results in major championships
Results not in chronological order in 2020.

CUT = missed the halfway cut
"T" = Tied
NT = No tournament due to the COVID-19 pandemic

Results in World Golf Championships

1Cancelled due to COVID-19 pandemic

NT = No tournament

Team appearances
Amateur
 European Boys' Team Championship (representing Sweden): 2008 (winners)
 European Amateur Team Championship (representing Sweden): 2011, 2013

See also
2016 European Tour Qualifying School graduates
2018 Challenge Tour graduates

References

External links

Swedish male golfers
Coastal Carolina Chanticleers men's golfers
European Tour golfers
Sportspeople from Jönköping County
People from Eksjö Municipality
1990 births
Living people